Madalitso Andrew Mkoloma (born 1985) is a Barbadian footballer who plays as a midfielder. He has been a member of the Barbados national team.

Early life
Mkoloma was born in 1985 in London, England to a Malawian father and a Barbadian mother. He is the younger brother of Sonia Mkoloma.

Club career
In November 2008, Mkoloma was playing for London-based side North Kensington.

International career
He made his international debut for Barbados in a May 2008 friendly match against Trinidad & Tobago, which remains his only international appearance to date.

References

1985 births
Living people
People with acquired Barbadian citizenship
Barbadian footballers
Association football midfielders
Barbados international footballers
Barbadian people of Malawian descent
Footballers from Greater London
English footballers
English people of Malawian descent
English sportspeople of African descent
English sportspeople of Barbadian descent
Black British sportspeople